The 1986 United States Senate election in Florida took place on November 4, 1986 alongside other elections to the United States Senate in other states as well as elections to the United States House of Representatives and various state and local elections. Incumbent Republican U.S. Senator Paula Hawkins decided to run for re-election to second term, but was defeated by Democrat Bob Graham, the popular incumbent Governor of Florida . , this was the last time an incumbent from Florida's Class 3 Senate seat lost re-election.

Democratic primary

Candidates
 Bob Graham, 38th Governor of Florida
 Bob Kunst, perennial candidate

Results

Republican primary

Candidates
 Paula Hawkins, incumbent U.S. Senator
 Jon Larsen Shudlick

Results

General election

Candidates
 Bob Graham (D), 38th Governor of Florida
 Paula Hawkins (R), incumbent U.S. Senator

Results

See also 
 1986 United States Senate elections

References 

Florida
1986
1986 Florida elections